Liara is an Asian genus of bush crickets in the tribe Agraeciini, belonging to the 'conehead' subfamily Conocephalinae.

Distribution
Species of Liara can be found in Indo-China and Malesia, including the Philippines.

Species
The Orthoptera Species File lists:
Subgenus Acanthocoryphus Karny, 1907
Liara brevis Ingrisch, 1998
Liara brongniarti Karny, 1907
Liara mindanensis Hebard, 1922
Subgenus Liara Redtenbacher, 1891
Liara alata Ingrisch, 1998
Liara baviensis Gorochov, 1994
Liara floricercus Ingrisch, 1990
Liara lobatus Redtenbacher, 1891
Liara magna Ingrisch, 1990
Liara monkra Ingrisch, 1998
Liara rufescens Redtenbacher, 1891 - type species
Liara tamdaoensis Gorochov, 1994
Liara tenebra Ingrisch, 1998
Liara tramlapensis Gorochov, 1994
Liara tulyensis Gorochov, 1994

References

External links 
 

Conocephalinae
Tettigoniidae genera
Orthoptera of Asia